Poljane pri Stični is a small settlement in the Municipality of Ivančna Gorica in central Slovenia. It lies beyond Metnaj to the north of Stična in the historical Lower Carniola region. The municipality is now included in the Central Slovenia Statistical Region.

Name
The name of the settlement was changed from Poljane to Poljane pri Stični in 1953.

References

External links

Poljane pri Stični on Geopedia

Populated places in the Municipality of Ivančna Gorica